Russia was represented by 105 athletes at the 2010 European Athletics Championships held in Barcelona, Spain.

Participants

Results

References 
 Participants list

Nations at the 2010 European Athletics Championships
2010
European Athletics Championships